Bill Fortner is an American politician and union welder serving as a member of the Wyoming House of Representatives from the 42nd district. Elected in November 2020, he assumed office on  January 4, 2021.

Early life and education 
Fortner was born and raised in Gillette, Wyoming. He attended the Gillette College Technical Education Center and was trained as a welder.

Career 
Fortner was elected to the Wyoming House of Representatives in November 2020 after defeating incumbent William Pownall in the August 2020 Republican primary. Fortner is a member of the Agriculture, State and Public Lands & Water Resources Committee.

References 

Living people
Republican Party members of the Wyoming House of Representatives
People from Gillette, Wyoming
People from Campbell County, Wyoming
Year of birth missing (living people)